William Charles Lee (born February 2, 1938) is a senior United States district judge of the United States District Court for the Northern District of Indiana.

Education and career

Born in Fort Wayne, Indiana, Lee received an Artium Baccalaureus degree from Yale University in 1959 and a Juris Doctor from the University of Chicago Law School in 1962. He was in private practice in Fort Wayne from 1962 to 1970. He was a deputy prosecuting attorney of Allen County, Indiana from 1963 to 1969. He was the United States Attorney for the Northern District of Indiana from 1970 to 1973. He was in private practice in Fort Wayne from 1973 to 1981.

Federal judicial service

Lee was nominated by President Ronald Reagan on July 1, 1981, to the United States District Court for the Northern District of Indiana, to a new seat created by 92 Stat. 1629. He was confirmed by the United States Senate on July 27, 1981, and received his commission on July 28, 1981. He served as Chief Judge from 1997 to 2003. He assumed senior status on February 3, 2003.

References

Sources
 

1938 births
Living people
Judges of the United States District Court for the Northern District of Indiana
United States district court judges appointed by Ronald Reagan
20th-century American judges
University of Chicago Law School alumni
Yale University alumni
United States Attorneys for the Northern District of Indiana
21st-century American judges
People from Fort Wayne, Indiana